The 2008 FIA GT Adria 2 Hours was the third round of the 2008 FIA GT Championship season.  It took place at Adria International Raceway, Italy, on June 21, 2008, and was held under night conditions for the second year in a row.

In post-race technical inspection, the three Porsches of Prospeed Competition and Trackspeed Racing were found to be using parts which did not match the parts used in the Porsche 997 GT3-RSR's homologation.  The three Porsche entries were disqualified from the race even though the FIA admitted that the fault was caused by the manufacturer, not the teams.  Prospeed Competition has appealed the disqualification of their two cars.

Provisional race results
Class winners in bold.  Cars failing to complete 75% of winner's distance marked as Not Classified (NC).  Cars with a C under their class are running in the Citation Cup, with the winner marked in bold italics.

Statistics
 Pole Position – #5 Carsport Holland – 1:11.731
 Average Speed – 128.70 km/h

References

Adria
FIA GT Adria